Events from the year 1776 in the United States. This year is celebrated in the United States as the official beginning of the nation, with the Declaration of Independence issued on July 4.

Events

January
 January 10 – Thomas Paine publishes Common Sense.
 January 20 – American Revolution: South Carolina Loyalists led by Robert Cunningham sign a petition from prison agreeing to all demands for peace by the newly formed state government of South Carolina.
 January 24 
American Revolution: Henry Knox arrives at Cambridge, Massachusetts, with the artillery that he has transported from Fort Ticonderoga.
American Revolution: The Continental Congress writes the third and final letter to the inhabitants of Canada urging Quebec to join the revolution.

February
 February 27 – American Revolution: Battle of Moore's Creek Bridge: North Carolina Loyalists charge across Moore's Creek bridge near Wilmington to attack what they mistakenly believe to be a small force of rebels. Several loyalist leaders are killed in the ensuing battle. The patriot victory virtually ends all British authority in the town.

March
 March 2–3 – American Revolution: Battle of the Rice Boats: Following the British seizure of rice from merchant ships on the Savannah River, militia from Georgia and South Carolina attack the British squadron on the river using fire ships.
 March 3–4 – Raid of Nassau.
 March 4 – American Revolution: The Americans capture "Dorchester Heights" dominating the port of Boston, Massachusetts.
 March 17 – American Revolution: Threatened by Patriot cannons on Dorchester Heights, the British evacuate Boston.
 March 28 – Juan Bautista de Anza finds the site for the Presidio of San Francisco.

April
 April 12 – American Revolution: The Royal Colony of North Carolina produces the Halifax Resolves making it the first British colony to officially authorize its Continental Congress delegates to vote for independence from the Kingdom of Great Britain.
 April 15 – Archibald Bulloch is sworn in as the first governor of Georgia.

May
 May 4 – American Revolution: Rhode Island becomes the first American colony to renounce allegiance to King George III of Great Britain.
 May 15 – American Revolution: The Continental Congress passes John Adams' preamble, explaining why a declaration of independence was being proposed. The Lee Resolution of independence is first brought before Congress.

June

 June 7 – American Revolution: Richard Henry Lee of Virginia proposes to the Continental Congress the Lee Resolution that "these united colonies are, and of right ought to be, free and independent states."
 June 8 – American Revolution: Battle of Trois-Rivières: American invaders are driven back at Trois-Rivières, Quebec.
 June 11 – American Revolution: The Continental Congress appoints the Committee of Five to draft the Declaration of Independence. The principal draft will be written by Thomas Jefferson.
 June 12 – American Revolution: Virginia Declaration of Rights by George Mason adopted by the Virginia Convention of Delegates.
 June 15 – American Revolution: Delaware Separation Day: The Delaware General Assembly votes to suspend government under the British Crown.
 June 17 – Lt. Jose Joaquin Moraga leads a band of colonists from Monterey Presidio, landing on June 29 and, with Father Francisco Palóu, constructing the Mission San Francisco de Asís ("Mission Dolores") of the new Presidio of San Francisco, the oldest surviving building in the modern-day city.
 June 28 - Battle of Sullivan's Island.
 June 28 – American Revolution: The Committee of Five presents their United States Declaration of Independence to the Continental Congress, which begins a further revision process, removing reference to slavery.
 June 29 – American Revolution: Battle of Turtle Gut Inlet – The Continental Navy successfully challenges the British Royal Navy blockade off Cape May County, New Jersey.

July

 July 1 – American Revolution: Congress sitting as a committee of the whole votes in favor of independence.
 July 2 – American Revolution: The final (despite minor revisions) U.S. Declaration of Independence is written. The full Continental Congress passes the Lee Resolution.
 July 3 – American Revolution: British troops first land on Staten Island, which will become the longest occupied land for the duration of the conflict.
 July 4 
  American Revolution: The United States Declaration of Independence, in which the United States officially declares independence from the British Empire, is approved by the Continental Congress and signed by its president, John Hancock, together with representatives from Connecticut, Delaware, Georgia, Maryland, Massachusetts Bay, New Hampshire, New Jersey, New York, North Carolina, Pennsylvania, Rhode Island, South Carolina and Virginia.
 John Rutledge is sworn in as the 31st governor of South Carolina.
 July 5 – Patrick Henry is sworn in as the first governor of Virginia.
 July 8 – American Revolution: The Liberty Bell rings for the first public reading of the Declaration of Independence at the Pennsylvania State House in Philadelphia.
 July 9 – American Revolution: An angry mob in New York City topples the equestrian statue of George III in Bowling Green.
 July 29 – Francisco Silvestre Vélez de Escalante, Francisco Atanasio Domínguez, and eight other Spaniards set out from Santa Fe on an eighteen-hundred mile trek through the American Southwest. They are the first Europeans to explore the vast region between the Rockies and the Sierras.

August
 August 12 – American Revolution: A parchment copy of the Declaration of Independence is signed by 56 members of Congress (not all of whom had been present on July 4).
 August 15 – American Revolution: First Hessian troops land on Staten Island to join British forces.
 August 27 – American Revolution: Battle of Long Island: Washington's troops routed in Brooklyn by British under William Howe.
 August 31 – William Livingston is sworn in as the first governor of New Jersey.

September
 September 1 – Invasion of Cherokee Nation by 6,000 patriot troops from Virginia, North Carolina, and South Carolina begins. The troops destroy thirty-six Cherokee towns.
 September 7 – American Revolution: World's first submarine attack. American submersible craft Turtle attempts to attach a time bomb to the hull of British Admiral Richard Howe's flagship HMS Eagle in New York Harbor.
 September 11 – American Revolution: The British and Americans meet at the Staten Island Peace Conference seeking to end the revolution. The meeting is brief and unsuccessful.
 September 15 – American Revolution: British land on Manhattan at Kip's Bay.
 September 16 – American Revolution: Battle of Harlem Heights is fought, and won, making it Washington's first battle field victory.
 September 22 – American Revolution: Nathan Hale executed in New York City for espionage.

October

 October 9 – Father Francisco Palou founds Mission San Francisco de Asis in what is now San Francisco, California.
 October 10 – Johnathan Trumbull is sworn in as the 16th governor of the Newley formed state of Connecticut.
 October 11 – American Revolution: Battle of Valcour Island: On Lake Champlain near Valcour Island, a British fleet led by Sir Guy Carleton defeats 15 American gunboats commanded by Brigadier General Benedict Arnold. Although nearly all of Arnold's ships are destroyed, the two-day-long battle will give Patriot forces enough time to prepare defenses of New York City.
 October 28 – American Revolution: Battle of White Plains: British forces arrive at White Plains, attack and capture Chatterton Hill from the Americans.
 October 31 – In his first speech before British Parliament since the Declaration of Independence that summer, King George III acknowledges that all is not going well for Britain in the war with the United States.

November
 November 10–28 – American Revolution: Battle of Fort Cumberland.
 November 16 – American Revolution: Battle of Fort Washington – Hessian forces under Lieutenant General Wilhelm von Knyphausen capture Fort Washington (Manhattan) from the American Continental Army.
 November 20 – American Revolution: Battle of Fort Lee – Invasion of New Jersey by British and Hessian forces and subsequent general retreat of the Continental Army.

December

 December 5 – Phi Beta Kappa honor society founded at the College of William and Mary.
 December 7 – American Revolution: Marquis de Lafayette attempts to enter the American military as a major general.
 December 14 – American Revolution: Ambush of Geary
 December 19 – American Revolution: Thomas Paine, living with Washington's troops, publishes the first in the series of pamphlets on The American Crisis in The Pennsylvania Journal, opening with the stirring phrase, "These are the times that try men's souls."
 December 21 – American Revolution: The Royal Colony of North Carolina reorganizes into the State of North Carolina after adopting its own constitution. Richard Caswell becomes the first governor of the newly formed state.
 December 22–23 – American Revolution: Battle of Iron Works Hill
 December 25 – American Revolution: At 6 p.m. Gen. George Washington and his troops, numbering 2,400, march to McConkey's Ferry, cross the Delaware River, and land on the New Jersey bank by 3 a.m. the following morning.
 December 26 – American Revolution: Battle of Trenton: Washington's troops surprise the 1500 Hessian troops under the command of Col. Johann Rall at 8 a.m. outside Trenton and score a victory, taking 948 prisoners while suffering only 5 wounded.

Births

January–June
 January 1 – James M. Broom, politician (died 1850)
 January 2 – Jeremiah Chaplin, Reformed Baptist theologian (died 1841)
 January 16 – Matthew Brown, college president (died 1853)
 January 21 – Elisha Haley, politician (died 1860)
 January 24 – Peter A. Jay, politician (died 1843)
 February 26 – Innis Green, congressman for Pennsylvania (died 1839)
 March 1 
 John Collins, manufacturer and politician (died 1822)
 Elias Moore, American-born politician (died 1847 in Canada)
 March 3 – James Parker, politician (died 1868)
 March 5 – Gerard Troost, mineralogist (died 1850)
 March 8 
 David Rogerson Williams, politician (died 1830)
 Samuel Tweedy, politician (died 1868)
 March 17 – Joel Abbot, politician (died 1826)
 March 19 – Philemon Beecher, politician (died 1839)
 March 20 – Joshua Bates, educator (died 1854)
 April 6 – Jesse Bledsoe, U.S. senator from Kentucky from 1813 to 1814 (died 1836)
 April 25 – James Miller, politician and military general (died 1851)
 May 5 – Valentine Efner, politician (died 1865)
 May 6 – Rensselaer Westerlo, politician (died 1851)
 May 13 – Jett Thomas, militia general (died 1817)
 May 17 – Amos Eaton, naturalist and pioneer of scientific education (died 1842)
 May 18 – Dennis Pennington, politician (died 1854)
 May 31 – José Antonio de la Garza, mayor (died 1851)
 June 1 – George Schetky, violoncellist and composer (died 1831)
 June 4 – Isaac B. Van Houten, politician (died 1850)
 June 6 – William Reed, politician (died 1837)
 June 19 – Francis Johnson, congressman (died 1842)
 June 23 – Stephen Longfellow, politician (died 1849)

July–December
 July 1 – Samuel Thatcher, politician (died 1872)
 July 4 – Ethan Allen Brown, politician (died 1852)
 July 5 
 Daniel Dobbins, captain in the U.S. Revenue Cutter Service (died 1856)
 Bernard Smith, politician (died 1835)
 July 10 – Samuel Powell, politician (died 1841)
 July 29 – James McSherry, politician (died 1849)
 August 13 – Abraham Shepherd, politician (died 1847)
 August 21 – Joseph Healy, politician (died 1861)
 August 26 – Henry A. Livingston, politician (died 1849)
 September 1 – Ezekiel Bacon, politician (died 1870)
 September 4 – Stephen Whitney, merchant (died 1860)
 September 9 – Parmenio Adams, politician (died 1832)
 September 15
 William Baylies, politician (died 1865)
 Calvin Willey, U.S. senator from Connecticut from 1825 to 1831 (died 1858)
 September 17 – Langdon Cheves, politician (died 1857)
 October 18 – Cowles Mead, politician (died 1844)
 October 30
 George M. Bibb, U.S. senator from Kentucky from 1811 to 1814 (died 1859)
 John Hahn, politician (died 1823)
 October 31 – Francis Locke, politician (died 1823)
 November 1 – Abraham McClellan, politician (died 1851)
 November 7 – Bartow White, politician (died 1862)
 November 10
 Samuel Gross, politician (died 1839)
 General Washington Johnston, politician (died 1833)
 December 1 
 Elijah H. Mills, politician (died 1829)
 Isaac Lacey, politician (died 1844)
 December 7 – Reuben Whallon, politician (died 1843)
 December 8 – William Logan, U.S. senator from Kentucky from 1819 to 1820 (died 1822)
 December 10 – David Marchand, politician (died 1832)
 December 13 – James Hawkes, congressman (died 1865)
 December 25 – John Slater, businessman (died 1843)
 December 30 – William Drayton, politician (died 1846)

Deaths
 March 26 – Samuel Ward, politician (born 1725)
 March 30 – Jonathan Belcher, lawyer, chief justice, and lieutenant governor of Nova Scotia (born 1710)
 June 28 – Thomas Hickey, sergeant in the Commander-in-Chief's Guard, tried and executed for mutiny and sedition (birth unknown) 
 August 1 – Francis Salvador, patriot (born 1747)
 September 22 – Nathan Hale, spy (born 1755; executed)
 December 27 – Johann Rall, Hessian colonel (born )

See also
 1776 in Great Britain
 Timeline of the American Revolution (1760–1789)

References

External links
 
 

 
1770s in the United States
United States
United States
Years of the 18th century in the United States